Kashish Malik is an Indian taekwondo athlete hails from Delhi, India. She has represented India at the Asian Games in 2018 and reached till the Quarter-finals. She is currently training under Peace Taekwondo Academy and supported by the Virat Kohli Foundation.

Kashish started practising taekwondo at the age of 14 after a fight with a bully happened in her school which made Kashish pick up taekwondo for life.

Tournaments Record

See also 

 Taekwondo in India
 Taekwondo at the 2019 South Asian Games

References 

Indian female taekwondo practitioners
Living people
Sportspeople from Delhi
2000 births
Taekwondo practitioners at the 2018 Asian Games
21st-century Indian women